Lupinus albus, commonly known as the white lupin or field lupine, is a member of the genus Lupinus in the family Fabaceae. It is a traditional pulse cultivated in the Mediterranean region.

Description 
The white lupin is an annual, more or less pubescent plant, 30 to 120 cm high, and has a wide distribution in the Mediterranean region. White lupine is widely spread as wild plants throughout the southern Balkans, the Italian mainland region of Apulia, the islands of Sicily, Corsica, and Sardinia, and the Aegean Sea, as well as in Lebanon, Israel, Palestine, and western Anatolia. It occurs in meadows, pastures, and grassy slopes, predominantly on sandy and acid soils. It is cultivated over all the Mediterranean region and also in Egypt, Sudan, Ethiopia, Syria, Central and Western Europe, USA and South America, Tropical and Southern Africa, Russia, and Ukraine. The ancient culture of white lupin under the local name "hanchcoly" was practiced until recently in Western Georgia. 

White lupin is distinct within the vast and polymorphous genus Lupinus L. for small variation of morphological characters. However, it has wide intraspecific variability in physiological plant properties: duration of vernalization time and growth rate, photoperiodic sensitivity, shape tolerance, drought resistance, and cold- and winter-hardiness. There are winter and spring forms of white lupin. Duration of the growing period under spring sowing varies from 106 to 180 days, seed mass per plant changes from 2.2 to 40 g, green mass yield per from 9 to 250 g, protein content in seed from 35.0 to 53.7%, and oil content from 6.2 to 12.0%.

Classification 
 Subsp. graecus (Boiss. et Spun.) Franko et Silva
 Subsp. termis (Forsk.) Ponert.
 Var. abissinicus Libk.
 Var. subroseus Libk.
 Subsp. albus L.
 Var. albus
 Var.vavilovii (Atab.) Kurl. et Stankev.
 Var vulgaris Libk.
 f. libkindae Kurl. et Stankev.

Cultivation and uses 

According to Zohary and Hopf (123, 2000), "even today the white lupin is an appreciated food crop and it is still cultivated in some Mediterranean countries – particularly Egypt." They list several archeological findsites that include Bronze Age Thera and several Roman Egypt sites. Today, lupin is known in Arabic as ترمس termes, and is a popular street snack in Egypt after being treated with several soakings of water, and then brined.

In Greece, and especially on the island of Crete and in the Peloponnese area, they are a very common snack during the period of lent before Easter. They are normally soaked in seawater for 2–3 hours to mellow the flavour and consumed raw.

In Spain, Portugal, and southern Italy it is a very popular snack (lupini in Italian, tremoços in Portuguese, altramuces or chochos in Spanish, tramussos in Catalan) as well as in some regions of Brazil.

History 
The beginning of the history of lupin cultivation in the Old World is often associated with the times of the ancient Egyptian civilization (Zhukovsky, 1929). It is, however, more likely (Kurlovich, 2002) that originally white lupin was introduced into cultivation in ancient Greece where its greatest biodiversity was concentrated and wild-growing forms have been preserved until nowadays (ssp. graecus). On the Balkan Peninsula, representatives of another subspecies of white lupin (ssp. termis and ssp. albus) turned wild and grows now in natural environments. Besides, the Grecian genesis of cultivated lupin is testified by lupin's Greek name thermos, which may be translated as "hot". Until today, in many countries of the world water-soaked and boiled lupin seeds are sold on markets and in bars as snacks (much like sunflower seeds). White lupin dispersed step-by-step from Greece to adjacent countries, in particular, to Egypt and Ancient Rome. The forms with white seeds and pink-and-blue or light-pink flowers (L. termis) spread mainly towards the south (Egypt, Libya, and Palestine), while the forms with white seeds and grayish-blue or white flowers (L. albus) moved to the west (Apennine Peninsula and farther).

Cultivation 
Since ancient times, white lupin has been largely widespread in the Mediterranean region and in the Middle East due to its soil amelioration properties and because it develops well on acidic soils. It tolerates a soil acidity up to pH = 6.5, while alkaline or organic soils aren't suitable. The soil must be well drained and loose because lupin is easily subject to root asphyxia. White lupin flourishes in the same climatic zones of maize, although lupin, except at the beginning of the growing season, requires little water because it has a long tap root.

Sowing 
In quite hot climatic zones, as in Italy, the sowing happens in October–November, after having ploughed the soil to bury the stubble of the previous crop, often a cereal. 100–150 kg/ha of seeds are used to obtain a final plant population of 30 plants per square meter, in rows 30 cm distant from each other. Thanks to its branched structure, the lupin can adapt to different sowing densities, compensating for a lower density with a higher branch growth. In colder zones, where lupin can't get through the winter, white lupin is sowed in the springtime, between March and April. The soil must be prepared as soon as possible after the winter break. The seedbed must be enough fine, particularly in organic farming where mechanical weeding is done (so that harrowing the displacement of clods doesn't cause harm). In case the of mechanical weeding, higher plant density (about 100 plants / m2), sowing about 200 kg seeds/ha, at a sowing depth of 3–4 cm is recommended. In the regions where lupin isn't indigenous, if it is cultivated for the first time on a soil or if the soil pH is higher than 6.5, lupin seeds must be inoculated with the nitrogen-fixing bacterium Rhizobium lupini. Soil acidity is an important factor for nitrogen fixation.

Fertilisation 
Thanks to the symbiosis with nitrogen-fixing bacteria, white lupin doesn't need nitrogen fertilisation, while it requires about 40 kg P2O5/ha and 60 kg K2O/ha. Fertilisations based on compost or composted manure are better than fresh manure. Thanks to its long tap root, white lupin can exploit well phosphorus reserves in the soil. The crop rotation for white lupin ideally lasts at least four, ideally five years and often lupin is grown after a cereal crop. Lupin is a good preculture since it let in the field about 50 kg nitrogen/ha.

Weed control 
The lupin doesn't compete well with weeds, particularly in the colder zones, because it closes the stand only in late summer. Mechanical weeding is feasible, also hoeing if the rows are wide enough. Chemical weeding is also used, by means of herbicides applied for other grain legumes.

Yield 
Depending on the climatic zone of cultivation, pods ripening happens from June–July to late August. Seeds don't ripen all at once and the harvesting shall be carried out when 90% of the pods are brown. To harvest with a combine harvester the ideally seed water content is 13-16%. Good yields are between 2 t/ha and 3,5 t/ha, although average yields are lower.

Diseases 
Based on the numerous diseases for Lupinus albus, the management is complex and very important. Higher yields can reach by early sowing dates, but this strategy can increase the affecting by pests and diseases.

Fungal diseases are often controlled with fungicides. To control the other diseases are the most effective practices the crop rotations and the use of disease-free seed.

Fungi
The following three fungi are lupin-specific and fully adapted to the presence of alkaloids:

Pleichaeta setosa causes brown-leaf spot. It is a problem of autumn-sown crops. Therefore, with the use of winter-hardy plant and the selection of frost tolerant plants, the tolerance of the genetic material has increased.

Uromyces lupinicolus is rust, which causes defoliation and reduces the biomass production. It is mainly developed during warm and dry summer periods. The chemical treatment with triazole fungicides is effective. There is no breeding program about rust tolerant plants designed.

Colletotrichum gloeosporioides is a seed-borne fungus disease. Therefore, it is present in an early lifecycle of the plant. So the plant can get killed before flowering, which means that the yield is null. In some cultivars resistance has been found. The most efficient way to control this fungi is through seed treatment.

Viruses
Bean mosaic virus is transmitted by aphids and with infected seed. It is the major viral disease for Lupinus albus. A major disease for the other lupines is cucumber mosaic virus. Lupinus albus is immune to this virus.

Pests
Phorbia platura is the only insect with significant impact on lupinus albus. 'The larvae damage the roots and hypocotyls and may destroy the crop.' The only useful treatment is the use of soil insecticides or seed treatment with systemic insecticides.

Aphids are also a problem. Mostly they are found during budding and early pod stages. They reduce crop yield and the numbers of flowers and also lead to pod formation. They can also transmit diseases.

Other pests
 bean seedling maggots (causing seedling to wilt and die)
 beetle and moth larvae (kill seedling)
 slugs (attack leaves)
 thrips (attack flowers and leaves)
 mired bugs (attack young seed pods)
 budworms (feed on pods and seeds)

Nutritional aspects 

The chemical composition of lupin seeds depends on the cultivation region except from the protein content which is independent from environmental conditions. The white lupin seeds contain a high amount of proteins. The net protein utilization is slightly lower than that of animal protein. The fats have a ratio of omega-6 (w-6) to omega-3 (w-3) from 2:1, whereby oleic acid (w-9) accounts for about 50% of the fat. The carbohydrates found in the seeds are mainly soluble and insoluble fibre and the starch content is very low. Therefore, lupin seeds have a low glycaemic index. The main macroelements found in white lupin seeds are K, Mn, and Mg, and the prevailing microelements are Ca, Fe, and Na.

The white lupin seeds have a low or very low content of antinutrients. Their removal is possible through food processing treatments (e.g. dehulling, germinating, cooking, soaking, fermentation, extraction). Total alkaloid content in sweet white lupin cultivars does not currently exceed 0.02%. Some of the sulphur-containing amino acids (about 4% of the proteins) may have an allergenic effect. The main allergens are Lup-1 (a conglutin b, vicilin-like protein), Lup-2 (conglutin a, legumin-like protein).

Animal nutrition

Ruminants 
Although an excessive use of L. albus, or other lupine species, can cause unwanted side-effects, this species seems to be promising to use at least as a feeding supplement. While L. albus is used in Australia to provide sheep fed with low-grade roughage with protein in form of a whole-grain feed supplement, there are concerns regarding product quality and safety. This is due to the susceptibility of some lupine cultivars towards Diaporthe toxica. This fungus causes a possibly fatal intoxication with lupine seed, called lupinosis, which appears to be mainly affecting sheep.

While there were no major negative health effects found in cattle, it is proposed that supplementation with L. albus tends to cause a decrease in milk protein concentration and milk protein yield in dairy cows. This has to be kept in mind, when lupine seeds should be used as a substitute for other protein sources in the diet of the ruminant. Nonetheless, roasted seeds of L. albus appear to be a good source of rumen protected fatty acids.

Non-ruminants 
As opposed to the advantages in ruminant diets, L. albus should not be considered as an optimal feed for pigs. Research indicated, that a diet based on white lupine results in poorer growth rates due to reduced feed intake, compared with other lupine species, such as L. angustifolius. As experiments showed, the feeding of L. albus can negatively affect the digestibility and the nutrient uptake in piglets.

Although broilers can tolerate a high share of lupine seeds in their diet, an excess use should be avoided, as it causes moist faeces, which negatively affects hygiene and therefore promotes health risks. It has been shown, that L. albus has the potential to partly replace the use of soybean in poultry production.

White lupin seeds have also been recommended for a long time to feed rabbits, being a good source of protein and energy. The seeds are also a potential useful feed for aquaculture, to replace partially fish meal or soybean meal.

See also
 Lupin bean and Lupinus for species and genus information, and for other uses of the lupin bean.

References 
 Kurlovich B.S. (2002) Lupins. Geography, classification, genetic resources and breeding, St. Petersburg, "Intan", 468p.
 Gladstones, J.S. 1974. Lupinus of the Mediterranean region and Africa. Bull. West. Austr. Depart. of Agr. 1974. N 26. 48 p.
 Gladstones, J.S. 1998. Distribution, Origin, Taxonomy, History and Importance. In: J.S. Gladstones et al. (eds.), Lupin as Crop Plants. Biology, Production and Utilization, 1-39.
 Zhukovsky, P.M. 1929. A contribution to the knowledge of genus Lupinus Tourn. Bull. Apll. Bot. Gen. Pl.-Breed., Leningrad-Moscow, XXI, I:16-294.
 Zohary, D. and Hopf, M. (2000) Domestication of plants in the Old World, third edition. Oxford: University Press.

Specific

External links 

 Classification for Kingdom Plantae Down to Species Lupinus albus L.
 pfaf.org
Seed proteome reference maps at Lupin Protein Team

albus
Plants described in 1753
Taxa named by Carl Linnaeus